The Eurovision Young Dancers 2013 was the thirteenth edition of the Eurovision Young Dancers, held at the  Baltic Opera House in Gdańsk, Poland on 14 June 2013. Organised by the European Broadcasting Union (EBU) and host broadcaster Telewizja Polska (TVP), dancers from ten countries participated in the televised final.  made their début while ,  and  returned. Four countries withdrew from the contest.

The event is aimed at young dancers aged between 16 and 21, competing in modern dances, be it solo or in couples, as long as they were not professionally engaged.

Sedrig Verwoert of the Netherlands won the contest, with Felix Berning of Germany placing second (runner-up).

Location

The chosen venue by the host broadcaster TVP was the Baltic Opera House in Gdańsk. The stage was designed by Michał Białousz.

Format
The format consists of dancers who are non-professional and between the ages of 16–21, competing in a performance of dance routines of their choice, which they have prepared in advance of the competition. All of the acts then take part in a choreographed group dance during 'Young Dancers Week'.

Presenters
Polish presenter Tomasz Kammel was the main host of the 2013 contest. For the first time, there were also two additional co-presenters who presented the backstage segments during the show. These were dancers Michael Nunn and William Trevitt of BalletBoyz.

Jury panel
Jury members of a professional aspect and representing the elements of ballet, contemporary, and modern dancing styles, score each of the competing individual and group dance routines. Once all the jury votes have been counted, the two participants which received the highest total of points progress to a final round. The final round consists of a 90-second 'dual', were each of the finalists perform a 45-second random dance-off routine. The overall winner upon completion of the final dances is chosen by the professional jury members. The jury members consisted of the following:

  – Krzysztof Pastor
  – Nadia Espiritu
 / – Cameron McMillan

Participants
The performance order was agreed by the Ballet Boyz, and approved by the chair of the EBU Steering Group on 10 June 2013.

Results

Final Duel

Broadcasting
The contest was broadcast by the following broadcasters:

See also
 Eurovision Song Contest 2013
 Junior Eurovision Song Contest 2013

References

External links 
 

Eurovision Young Dancers by year
2013 in Poland
June 2013 events in Europe
Historical events in Poland